Walsrode is a town in the district of Heidekreis, in Lower Saxony, Germany. The former municipality Bomlitz was merged into Walsrode in January 2020.

History

Middle Ages

986 Foundation of Walsrode Abbey by Count Walo. The first recorded mention of the town is dated May 7, 986.

1383 The dukes of Brunswick and Lüneburg grant Walsrode a town charter.

1479 First recorded instance of Walsrode's coat of arms. At the end of the 15th century the sculptor Hans Brüggemann, creator of the renowned Bordesholm Altar of Schleswig Cathedral, is born in the town.

Early modern times

1626 Extensive destruction in the town by the troops of Count Tilly during the Thirty Years' War.

1757 The town is totally destroyed by a catastrophic fire.

1811 During the Napoleonic era, Walsrode becomes a border town between France and the Kingdom of Westphalia.

1814 Walsrode is incorporated in the Kingdom of Hanover.

1866 Annexation of Walsrode by Prussia.

1890 Railroad first extends to Walsrode.

20th century
1957 The German border patrol agency (Bundesgrenzschutz) establishes a training school in the town.

1984 The state legislature of Lower Saxony allows the town to incorporate as an "independent community".

Places of interest
Walsrode Abbey
Rischmannshof Heath Museum
Weltvogelpark Walsrode

Twin towns – sister cities

Walsrode is twinned with:
 Blainville-sur-Orne, France
 Gernrode (Quedlinburg), Germany
 Hibbing, United States
 Kępice, Poland
 Kovel, Ukraine
 Zaltbommel, Netherlands

Notable people
Hans Brüggemann (c. 1480–1521), artist
Louis Harms (1808–1865), lutheran pastor
Hermine Overbeck-Rohte (1869–1938), landscape painter
Maren Kroymann (born 1949), actress and singer
Gaby Papenburg (born 1960), sports journalist
Frank Glorius (born 1972), chemist
Onur Ayık (born 1990), footballer

See also
Metropolitan region Hannover-Braunschweig-Göttingen-Wolfsburg

References

External links

 
Towns in Lower Saxony
Heidmark